Shorea quadrinervis (called, along with some other species in the genus Shorea, light red meranti) is a species of plant in the family Dipterocarpaceae. It is a tree endemic to Borneo. It is threatened by habitat loss.

References

quadrinervis
Endemic flora of Borneo
Trees of Borneo
Taxonomy articles created by Polbot